= Loventué =

Coordinates: 36°11′S 65°18′W

- Rural locality and village
- Interactive map of Loventué
- Country: Argentina
- Province: La Pampa Province
- Time zone: UTC−3 (ART)

Loventué is a village and rural locality (municipality) in La Pampa Province in Argentina.
